Route 933 is a  long north to south secondary highway in the southeastern portion of New Brunswick, Canada.

Route description
Most of the route is in Westmorland County.

The route's northern terminus is in Barachois at Route 133. It travels south through a mostly wooded area where it begins following the Aboujagane River passing over Route 15 exit 43 where the route is known as Upper Aboujagane Rd.  The route passes through Village Scandainave Glaude, Scoudouc Road, then Bourgeois Mills.  The route continues southeast passing the western terminus of Route 945 in Haute-Aboujagane, Basse-Aboujagane, and Drisdelle.  The route then briefly turns east where it is known as Malakoff Rd then continues southwest on Aboujagane Rd as a gravel road to Memramcook East.  From here the route briefly turns north on Memramcook East Rd then turns east onto Pont Rouge Rd crossing Route 2 Exit 488 then ending in Memramcook at Route 106 near Memramcook River.

History

See also

References

933
933